in vain is a 2000 composition for 24 instruments by Austrian composer Georg Friedrich Haas. It was premiered on October 29, 2000 by Sylvain Cambreling and the Klangforum Wien and lasts approximately 70 minutes. The piece is one of Haas' best-known works.

Background and composition 
in vain was commissioned by the Westdeutscher Rundfunk for Sylvain Cambreling (to whom the work is dedicated) and Klangforum Wien. Haas wrote the piece in response to the rise of the far-right in Austria. 

The piece deals extensively with microtonality. The light levels in the hall are specified in the score; some sections of the piece are played in very bright light, and about twenty minutes are played in complete darkness.

Instrumentation 
The piece is scored for the following ensemble:

Woodwinds
 
 Oboe
 
 
 Bassoon
Brass
 2 Horns in F
 2 Trombones

Keyboards
 Accordion
 Piano

Percussion
 Percussion 1:
 Marimba
 Crotales
 Glockenspiel
 Plate bell (E)
 Cymbal
 Tam-tam
 Percussion 2:
 Crotales
 Glockenspiel
 Vibraphone
 Plate bell (B)
 Chinese cymbal
 Tam-tam

Strings

 Harp

 3 Violins
 2 Violas
 2 Cellos
 Double bass (five string)

Reception 
Simon Rattle has hailed in vain as "one of the first masterpieces of the 21st century", and the Austrian newspaper Die Presse has called it a "classic". The piece was named the greatest work of art music since 2000 in a Classic Voice poll.

In his 2007 book The Rest Is Noise, Alex Ross wrote that the piece "may mark a new departure in Austro-German music, joining spectral harmony to a vast Brucknerian structure".

References 

2000 compositions
Contemporary classical compositions
Microtonality
Spectral music